Progress MS-11, identified by NASA as Progress 72P, was a Progress spaceflight operated by Roscosmos to resupply the International Space Station (ISS). This was the 163rd flight of a Progress spacecraft.

History 
The Progress-MS is an uncrewed freighter based on the Progress-M featuring improved avionics. This improved variant first launched on 21 December 2015. It has the following improvements:

 New external compartment that enables it to deploy satellites. Each compartment can hold up to four launch containers. First time installed on Progress MS-03.
 Enhanced redundancy thanks to the addition of a backup system of electrical motors for the docking and sealing mechanism.
 Improved Micrometeoroid (MMOD) protection with additional panels in the cargo compartment.
 Luch Russian relay satellites link capabilities enable telemetry and control even when not in direct view of ground radio stations.
 GNSS autonomous navigation enables real time determination of the status vector and orbital parameters dispensing with the need of ground station orbit determination.
 Real time relative navigation thanks to direct radio data exchange capabilities with the space station.
 New digital radio that enables enhanced TV camera view for the docking operations.
 The Ukrainian Chezara Kvant-V on board radio system and antenna/feeder system has been replaced with a Unified Command Telemetry System (UCTS).
 Replacement of the Kurs A with Kurs NA digital system.

Pre-launch 
In 2014, the launch was scheduled for 16 April 2018. In November 2018, delays with the launch of the EgyptSat-A spacecraft and required the launch to 28 March 2019, the Kommersant newspaper reported. In January 2019, RIA Novosti reported that the launch had been pushed to 4 April 2019.

Launch 
Progress MS-11 launched on 4 April 2019, at 11:01:34 UTC  from the Baikonur Cosmodrome in Kazakhstan. It used a Soyuz-2.1a rocket.

Docking 
Progress MS-11 docked with the docking port of the Pirs module just 3 hours and 22 minutes after the launch, at 14:22:26 UTC.

Cargo 
The Progress MS-11 spacecraft delivered 3,400 kg of cargo, with 1,400 kg of this being dry cargo.
The following is a breakdown of cargo bound for the ISS:

 Dry cargo: 1,400 kg
 Fuel: 900 kg
 Compressed Air: 47 kg
 Water: 420 kg (Rodnik system)

Equipment for several life science experiments, including Bioplenka, Konstanta-2, Produtsent, Mikrovir, Struktura, Biodegradatsiya and Kristallizator. The spacecraft also carried the Faza vessel for growing water plants and the associated lighting system for the Ryaska educational experiment.

Undocking and decay 
It undocked at 10:43 UTC, on 29 July 2019. And decay in the atmosphere and its debris entered the Pacific Ocean, on the same day.

See also 
 Uncrewed spaceflights to the International Space Station

References 

Progress (spacecraft) missions
Spacecraft launched in 2019
2019 in Russia
Supply vehicles for the International Space Station
Spacecraft launched by Soyuz-2 rockets
Spacecraft which reentered in 2019